Betts v. Brady, 316 U.S. 455 (1942), was a landmark United States Supreme Court case that denied counsel to indigent defendants prosecuted by a state. The reinforcement that such a case is not to be reckoned as denial of fundamental due process was famously overruled by Gideon v. Wainwright.

Background 
In its decision in Johnson v. Zerbst, the Supreme Court had held that defendants in federal courts had a right to counsel guaranteed by the Sixth Amendment. In Powell v. Alabama, the Court had held that state defendants in capital cases were entitled to counsel, even when they could not afford it; however, the right to an attorney in trials in the states was not yet obligatory in all cases as it was in federal courts under Johnson v. Zerbst. In Betts v. Brady, Betts was indicted for robbery and upon his request for counsel, the trial judge refused, forcing Betts to represent himself. He was convicted of robbery, a conviction he eventually appealed to the Supreme Court on the basis that he was being held unlawfully because he had been denied counsel.

Betts filed writ of habeas corpus at the Circuit Court for Washington County, Maryland, and claimed that he had been denied counsel. He then filed a petition for writ of certiorari to the Court of Appeals of Maryland, the state's ultimate appellate court. All of his petitions were denied. Finally, he filed for certiorari to the Supreme Court.

Issue 
In a 6–3 decision, the Court found that Betts did not have the right to be appointed counsel with Justice Hugo Black emphatically dissenting. In the majority opinion, Justice Owen Roberts stated,

Throughout the opinion, Roberts continually makes the point that not all defendants in all cases will need the assistance of counsel in order to receive a fair trial with due process. Roberts appears to be of the opinion that while counsel may be necessary to receive a fair trial in some cases, that is not true in all cases. However, in his dissent, Black wrote:

Black stated in his dissent that the denial of counsel based on financial stability makes it that those in poverty have an increased chance of conviction, which is not equal protection of the laws under the Fourteenth Amendment. During his dissent, Black cited also Johnson v. Zerbst and made the point that had the proceedings of Betts's case been held in federal court, his petition for counsel to be appointed to him would have been accepted, and counsel would have been appointed. Black argued that because this right was guaranteed in federal courts, the Fourteenth Amendment should make the right obligatory upon the states, but the majority disagreed. Black argued also that a man of even average intelligence could not possibly be expected to represent himself without any training in such matters as the law.

See also
 List of United States Supreme Court cases, volume 316

References

External links
 
 

1942 in United States case law
United States Supreme Court cases
United States Supreme Court cases of the Stone Court
United States Sixth Amendment appointment of counsel case law
American Civil Liberties Union litigation
Overruled United States Supreme Court decisions